The 2017 Three Days of De Panne (Dutch: Driedaagse De Panne–Koksijde) was the 41st edition of the Three Days of De Panne cycling stage race. The race included four stages over three days, from 28–30 March 2017. It was rated as a 2.HC event in the 2017 UCI Europe Tour.

The race was won by  rider Philippe Gilbert, after he attacked on the Muur van Geraardsbergen during the race's opening stage and soloed away to the victory by 17 seconds from his nearest competitor. Kristoff's consistent finishing over the stages won him the points classification, while Gilbert won the sprints classification, primarily from his opening-day attack.

Route
The race included four stages; three road stages, while the fourth and final stage was an individual time trial.

Teams
24 teams took part in the 2017 Three Days of De Panne. 7 of these were UCI WorldTeams, 13 were UCI Professional Continental teams, and 4 were UCI Professional Continental teams.

Stages

Stage 1
28 March 2017 — De Panne to Zottegem,

Stage 2
29 March 2017 — Zottegem to Koksijde,

Stage 3a
30 March 2017 — De Panne to De Panne,

Stage 3b
30 March 2017 — De Panne to De Panne, individual time trial (ITT)

Classification leadership table
In the 2017 Three Days of De Panne, four different jerseys were awarded. For the general classification, which was calculated by adding each cyclist's finishing times on each stage, and allowing time bonuses for the first three finishers at intermediate sprints and at the finish of mass-start stages, the leader received a white jersey. This classification was considered the most important of the 2017 Three Days of De Panne, and the winner of the classification was considered the winner of the race.

Additionally, there was a points classification, which awarded a green jersey. In the points classification, cyclists received points for finishing in the top placings of a stage. On the first two days; for winning a stage, a rider earned 20 points, with 18 for second, 16 for third, 14 for fourth, 12 for fifth, 10 for sixth with a point fewer per place down to a single point for 15th place. On the final day, points were awarded to the top 10 riders, with 10 points for the winner and a point fewer per place down to a single point for 10th place. There was also a sprints classification for points awarded at the race's intermediate sprints, where riders received points for finishing in the top three at these sprints; the leadership of which was marked by a blue jersey.

There was also a mountains classification, the leadership of which was marked by a red jersey. Points for this classification were won by the first riders to the top of each categorised climb, on a 5–3–1 scale as all climbs were categorised the same. There was also a classification for teams, in which the times of the best three cyclists per team on each stage were added together; the leading team at the end of the race was the team with the lowest total time.

References

External links
 

Three Days of Bruges–De Panne
Three Days of De Panne
Three Days of De Panne